M/Y Eclipse is a superyacht built by Blohm+Voss of Hamburg, Germany, the third longest afloat. Her exterior and interior were designed by Terence Disdale. The yacht is owned by Roman Abramovich, and was delivered on 9 December 2010. The yacht's cost has been estimated at €340 million.

Features 
Eclipse has two helicopter pads, 24 guest cabins, two swimming pools, several hot tubs, and a disco hall. Approximately 70 crew members are needed to operate the yacht and serve the guests.

For security, Eclipse is fitted with a missile detection system, missile launchers and self-defense systems.

By 2009, Eclipse was also the largest vessel employing a rotor-based stabilization system against roll motion at anchor and at low cruise speeds, based on the Magnus effect.

History 

Eclipse was launched on 12 June 2009. She arrived in Frederikshavn, Denmark, on 18 September 2009, for sea trials, and was delivered to Abramovich on 9 December 2010. First pictures of the completed yacht were taken at Kristiansand, Norway, during her refuelling.

In February 2011 Eclipse was made available for charter through SuperYachtsMonaco, a Monaco-based yacht brokerage company.

Eclipse travels to St. Martin in the Caribbean each winter to pick up guests who fly in to St. Martin's airport. The yacht then travels to Abramovich's home on nearby St. Barts. In March of 2022, Forbes reported that Eclipse, at 533 feet, was still owned by Abramovich. As of June 2022, she had last been recorded in Göcek, Fethiye in Turkey, and was still registered in Bermuda with value of $438 million.

On the 13th of September 2022, she was seen in the port of Yalikava in Turkey.

References

External links 

 Video of launch of yacht Eclipse

2009 ships
Motor yachts
Passenger ships of Bermuda
Ships built in Hamburg
Roman Abramovich